Party participation in the mediation process is the crux of the mediation process. When parties agree to a mediation process, they then have the power vested in them to arrive at a mutually acceptable solution to the dispute. The mediator has power over the process, but not the outcome. The mediator should be impartial and have no influence or control over the outcome. The mediation is an endeavour by the parties to reach an agreement, usually to avoid, or in preference to a court based processes.

Neutrality of the process
The success of mediation as a "win/win" alternative dispute resolution method is most often attributed to its qualities as a consensual, voluntary and fair process. Therefore mediation is framed as a process which is neutral and procedurally fair, designed to increase party participation and self-determination through decision-making and to create a mutually acceptable outcome. 

The expectation is for all parties to participate in the mediation process. However, because the participation of the parties and the mediator is voluntary, the parties and or the mediator have the freedom to leave the process at any time.

Refusal to participate
Procedural fairness could become an issue in an employment dispute where a worker refuses to participate in a mediation process, especially if a dismissal was the end result. In the instance of legitimate reasons for absence, such as ill health, a representative may be nominated to act in that party's best interests. Parties are expected to act in a civil and courteous manner, to act in a positive way and be prepared to be flexible in order to reach a mutually acceptable agreement. Mediators are expected to facilitate constructive participation by the parties. Party participation is an important indicator since mediation is a voluntary decision and cannot progress without all the parties’ agreement to participatory commitment.

Results
If the case can not be mediated or settled in a conference, then the matter or case may be brought to trial.

Notes

See also
 Alternate dispute resolution
 Arbitration
 Brought to trial
 Dispute resolution
 Mediation
 Settlement
 Settlement conference
 Trial (law)

References
Boulle, L. (2005). Mediation: Principles Process Practice. 2nd Edition. Queensland, Australia. LexisNexis Butterworths.
Coburn, C. & Jensen, M.  Conflict in the workplace: is mediation an appropriate response?. Retrieved on 27 October 2006, from 
Katsh, E. & Wing, L. (2006). Ten Years of Online Dispute Resolution (ODR): Looking at the Past and Constructing the Future. Retrieved on 26 October 2006 from 

Mediation